Sirhowy is a village in the Sirhowy Valley and the county of Blaenau Gwent.

The A4048 runs near the village.

Tourism 

The area is also known as a popular rock climbing site due to the geology of the area offering "one of the best chunks of quarried sandstone in the area". UK Climbing describe this as providing a "brilliant line-up of fingery wall climbs" and "plenty of excellent (slightly) easier climbing on some of the best rock around."

History 
The Gwent Heritage voluntary group have extensively documented the history of the area as far back as its mining establishment. The group's branch meets regularly to contribute to the collection of materials covering the region.

The Sirhowy River flows past the west of the village.

Ironworks 

The ironworks established in the village were first established in 1778 operated by William Borrow, Rev. Matthew Monkhouse and Richard Fothergill and are of regional and national significance, and are well preserved. It supplied first Tredegar Ironworks and later Ebbw Vale Ironworks with pig iron. In 1818 the works were acquired by James Harford of Harford, Partridge and Co. of Ebbw Vale. By 1877 it was overproducing iron and was partly demolished, however it continued to produce coke until 1905. The remains of the site include the three masonry arches, furnace base, waterwheel tunnel, and other earthworks. It is a scheduled monument listed by Coflein and Visit Wales and is open to visitors.

Present day 
Facilities in Sirhowy include a Tai Calon Community Housing centre named Star Centre, Welsh Government funded Flying Start hub, one pub, one restaurant, an IndyCube co-working space, and two garages.

Transport

Rail
The village was formerly served by the defunct Sirhowy railway station. The village is now a 40-minute walk  from Ebbw Vale Town railway station. From there services run to and from Cardiff Central. In 2021 services will also run to Newport.

Bus
The village is served by several bus stops providing services to various locations as listed below.

 X4 (Cardiff to Brynmawr/Abergavenny)
 E11 (Ebbw Vale to Tredegar)	
 97 (Ebbw Vale to Peacehaven)

Governance
Sirhowy is covered by an electoral ward of the same name, though this covers a far larger area to the northwest of the village. The population of the ward in 2011 was 5,630. 

The ward's Councillors are Brian Thomas (Ind, Sirhowy), Malcolm Cross (Lab, Sirhowy), and Tommy Smith (Lab, Sirhowy).

The area is represented in the Senedd by Alun Davies (Labour) and the Member of Parliament is Nick Smith (Labour).

References

External links 
 Photos of Sirhowy and surrounding area on Geograph
 Sirhowy Woodlands website

Villages in Blaenau Gwent
Tredegar